Horseleg Lake is a lake in Isanti County, in the U.S. state of Minnesota.

Horseleg Lake was so named on account of its outline being shaped like the leg of a horse.

See also
List of lakes in Minnesota

References

Lakes of Minnesota
Lakes of Isanti County, Minnesota